Saccopharynx thalassa is a species of ray-finned fish within the family Saccopharyngidae. Its known to live in the Eastern Atlantic near Madeira and the Canary Islands, and the Western Atlantic near Bermuda at depths up to 1,700 meters. It grows to a length of 107 to 110 centimeters. It has been classified as a 'Least concern' species by the IUCN Red List, as it has a wide distribution with no known major threats.

References 

Fish described in 1985
IUCN Red List least concern species
Fish of the Atlantic Ocean
Taxa named by Jørgen G. Nielsen
Deep sea fish
Saccopharyngidae